Dezq may refer to:

 Dezq, Mashhad
 Dezq, Nishapur
 Dezg (disambiguation)